Rebeka Masarova was the defending champion but chose to compete at the 2022 Internazionali Femminili di Palermo instead.

Jessika Ponchet won the title, defeating Jenny Dürst in the final, 6–4, 7–5.

Seeds

Draw

Finals

Top half

Bottom half

References

External Links
Main Draw

Open Araba en Femenino - Singles